Joshua Morris is an American Republican politician who has represented the 75th district in the Maine House of Representatives since 2018. He is on the Health Coverage, Insurance and Financial Services committee. He is also a realtor.

References

Year of birth missing (living people)
Living people
Republican Party members of the Maine House of Representatives